John Burke is an Irish former footballer who played as a defender.

After playing for Munster junior side Cahir Park, he joined Shamrock Rovers in 1927 where he stayed until 1935. He made his debut at inside-left at Fordsons on Sunday 6 November 1927 in a 2–2 draw.

He won one senior cap for the Irish Free State on 20 April 1929 in a 4–0 friendly win against Belgium at Dalymount Park. Burke is unique in that while he won only one cap he was captain for the game.

He represented the League of Ireland XI once while at Glenmalure Park in 1929.

His son Mickey Burke later played for Rovers in the 1950s representing the club twice in European competition.

Honours
League of Ireland: 1
  Shamrock Rovers – 1931–32
FAI Cup: 5
  Shamrock Rovers – 1929, 1930, 1931, 1932, 1933
League of Ireland Shield: 3
  Shamrock Rovers – 1931–32, 1932–33, 1934–35
Leinster Senior Cup: 3
  Shamrock Rovers – 1929, 1930, 1933
LFA President's Cup: 2
  Shamrock Rovers – 1929–30, 1933–34

Sources 
 The Hoops by Paul Doolan and Robert Goggins

Association footballers from County Tipperary
Republic of Ireland association footballers
Shamrock Rovers F.C. players
League of Ireland players
League of Ireland XI players
Association football defenders
Irish Free State international footballers
Year of birth missing